Coalition of Domestic Election Observers (CODEO) is an independent and non-partisan organisation made up of civil society groups, faith-based organizations and professional organisations which observe elections in Ghana.

It was established in 2000 by the Ghana Center for Democratic Development (CDD-Ghana) to assist Ghanaians to engage in country's electoral processes and to assist the Electoral Commission of Ghana. It was initially co-chaired by V.C.R.A.C. Crabbe, a Supreme Court Judge and Miranda Greenstreet, an academic.

References 

Elections in Ghana
Civic and political organisations of Ghana